Michael "Mickey" Daly (born June 4, 1987) is an American soccer player.

Career

College
Daly played at California State University, Los Angeles where he made the 2009 NCAA Division II All America 1st team in 2009.

Professional

Wilmington Hammerheads FC
Daly signed his first professional contract with USL Pro club Wilmington Hammerheads in April 2013. He made his debut on April 29, 2013 in a 3–1 loss to Phoenix FC.

Sacramento Republic FC
Prior to the 2014 season, Daly was signed by Sacramento Republic FC for their inaugural season. Daly impressed during the 2014 season earning 33 appearances, scoring 4 goals, and earning two USL Team of the Week awards. Daly would win his first USL Championship with Sacramento defeating Harrisburg City Islanders 2-0 for the 2014 USL Pro Title.

The 2015 season would see Daly keep his starting place in the making 33 appearances and scoring twice. Sacramento would go on to make the playoffs for the second consecutive season, but lost out in the first round to eventual finalists LA Galaxy II.

Bethlehem Steel FC
On December 11, 2015, Daly signed with Bethlehem Steel FC. Daly would become an immediate starter for the club making 9 appearances and tallying 1 goal for Steel FC.

Carolina Railhawks
In July 2016, Bethlehem Steel FC loaned Daly out to Carolina Railhawks for a one-month loan with the option to buy after. Impressing through 6 matches, the Railhawks exercised their purchase option in September 2016, making the transfer permanent.

OKC Energy
Daly signed with USL side OKC Energy FC on January 17, 2017.

Fresno FC
Daly signed with new USL club Fresno FC on December 5, 2017.

Career statistics

References

External links
 USL profile 
 
 NASL profile

1987 births
Living people
American soccer players
Association football defenders
Philadelphia Union II players
Fresno FC players
North American Soccer League players
North Carolina FC players
OKC Energy FC players
People from Sonoma, California
Sacramento Republic FC players
Soccer players from California
Sportspeople from the San Francisco Bay Area
USL Championship players
USL League Two players
Ventura County Fusion players
Wilmington Hammerheads FC players